Hyperlopha cristifera is a moth of the family Noctuidae first described by Francis Walker in 1863. It is found in Sri Lanka, Laos, Malaysia and Australia. Adult wings are pale brown, sometimes with a number of dark dots near the tornus of each forewing. Forewings with a hooked wingtip, and a cusp on the margin can be found.

Two subspecies are recognized including the nominate race.
Hyperlopha cristifera cristifera Walker, 1863
Hyperlopha cristifera orientalis Hulstaert, 1924

References

External links
Checklist of the superfamily Noctuoidea (Insecta, Lepidoptera) from Tamil Nadu, Western Ghats, India

Moths of Asia
Moths described in 1863